The Montville Township School District is a comprehensive community public school district that serves students in pre-kindergarten through twelfth grade from Montville, in Morris County, New Jersey, United States.

As of the 2020–21 school year, the district, comprised of seven schools, had an enrollment of 3,439 students and 359.1 classroom teachers (on an FTE basis), for a student–teacher ratio of 9.6:1.

The district is classified by the New Jersey Department of Education as being in District Factor Group "I", the second-highest of eight groupings. District Factor Groups organize districts statewide to allow comparison by common socioeconomic characteristics of the local districts. From lowest socioeconomic status to highest, the categories are A, B, CD, DE, FG, GH, I and J.

Awards and recognition
In 2016, Cedar Hill Elementary School was one of ten schools in New Jersey recognized as a National Blue Ribbon School by the United States Department of Education.

The district and several of its schools have been recognized by Character.org in its Schools of Character program. In 2016, Cedar Hill Elementary School and Woodmont Elementary School were named New Jersey and National Schools of Character. In 2018, Robert R. Lazar Middle School was named a New Jersey and National School of Character and the Montville School District was named a New Jersey and National District of Character. In 2019, William Mason Elementary School was named a New Jersey State and National School of Character. In 2020, Hilldale Elementary School and Valley View Elementary School were names New Jersey State Schools of Character.

All of the Montville Township Public Schools have attained Bronze Level certification through the Sustainable Jersey for Schools Program.

For the 1994-95 school year, Robert R. Lazar Middle School was named as a "Star School" by the New Jersey Department of Education, the highest honor that a New Jersey school can achieve.

In 2013, Valley View Elementary School was named as a high performing "Reward School" by the New Jersey Department of Education, one of 57 schools statewide and eight in Morris County to earn this recognition.

Schools 
Schools in the district (with 2020–21 enrollment data from the National Center for Education Statistics) are:
Elementary schools
Cedar Hill Elementary School with 295 students in grades PreK-5
Dr. Michael Raj, Principal
Hilldale Elementary School with 297 students in grades K-5
Jill Cisneros, Principal
William H. Mason Jr. Elementary School with 239 students in grades K-5
Dave Melucci, Principal
Valley View Elementary School with 339 students in grades PreK-5
Dr. Patricia J. Kennedy, Principal
Woodmont Elementary School with 307 students in grades K-5
Dominic Esposito, Principal
Middle school
Robert R. Lazar Middle School with 839 students in grades 6-8
Michael Pasciuto, Principal
High school
Montville Township High School with 1,079 students in grades 9-12
Douglas Sanford, Principal
After school
Montville Extended Day Learning Center is an after-school program available at all the elementary schools in the district.

Administration 
Core members of the district's administration are:
Dr. Thomas A. Gorman, Superintendent
Katine Slunt, Business Administrator / Board Secretary

Board of education
The district's board of education is comprised of nine members who set policy and oversee the fiscal and educational operation of the district through its administration. As a Type II school district, the board's trustees are elected directly by voters to serve three-year terms of office on a staggered basis, with three seats up for election each year held (since 2012) as part of the November general election. The board appoints a superintendent to oversee the district's day-to-day operations and a business administrator to supervise the business functions of the district.

References

External links
Montville Township School District

Montville Township School District, National Center for Education Statistics

Montville, New Jersey
New Jersey District Factor Group I
School districts in Morris County, New Jersey